A Legionnaire is a member of the French army corps Légion Étrangère.

Legionnaire may also refer to:

Member of an organization
 A member of the American Legion
 A member of the Iron Guard (The Legion of the Archangel Michael)
 A member of the Spanish Legion
 A misused term for a legionary, an infantry soldier of the ancient Roman Army
 A member of the fictional Legion of Super-Heroes in DC Comics

Other uses
 A Legionnaire, a 1936 French comedy film
 Legionnaire (film), a 1998 American war drama starring Jean Claude Van Damme
 Legionnaire (role-playing game), a 1990 science fiction game
 Legionnaire (video game), a 1982 8-bit computer game
 Legionnaire (passenger train), later Minnesotan, a train operated by Chicago Great Western Railway 1925–1949

See also
 Legionnaires' disease
 Legion (disambiguation)